The 1996 Marlboro Grand Prix of Miami Presented by Toyota was a CART race at the Metro-Dade Homestead Motorsports Complex, held on March 3, 1996. It was the first round of the 1996 IndyCar season, and first CART race since the open-wheel split in 1996. It was preceded in the 1996 racing season by the inaugural Indy Racing League race in Orlando, which was not contested by any of the CART drivers that appeared at Homestead. Jimmy Vasser scored the first win of his CART career. It was also the second major racing event at the recently completed 1.527-mile oval, which had previously hosted a NASCAR Busch Grand National event in November 1995.

Report

Qualifying
Due to rain on Saturday afternoon, the qualifying session occurred on Sunday morning. Canadian driver Paul Tracy, on his return to Marlboro Team Penske after spending a year at Newman/Haas Racing, set the pole with a lap of 198.590 mph (27.681s) in a Penske PC25-Mercedes car. All of the qualified cars were newly built for the 1996 season, with CART having adopted new technical rules that altered the underbody tunnels and sidepods, and were expected to reduce downforce and increase the focus on mechanical grip.

Race
On the start, Mark Blundell spun and Roberto Moreno had an unrelated contact with the wall. Then, the start was aborted for the second time, as Tracy was deemed to have jumped the start. At the end of lap 1, another caution came out as Michael Andretti hit Maurício Gugelmin and lost his front wing. After the restart, Tracy continued to lead for 8 laps of racing, until rain began to fall. The cars circulated under caution period conditions until the decision was made to red flag the race with Tracy in the lead. 

The race restarted after a half-hour delay, with Tracy continuing to lead the race comfortably while second-place was contested between Gil de Ferran, Vasser, and Scott Pruett. Meanwhile, Al Unser Jr. hit Carlos Guerrero, and fell a lap down to repair his front wing. Andre Ribeiro and Robby Gordon made contact on Lap 82 while fighting for position, bringing out a caution period. During the ensuing pit stops, Tracy retired from the lead due to a transmission failure. On the same lap, rookie Alex Zanardi crashed under caution as his wheel separated following his pit stop. 

Light rain again delayed the restart until Lap 102. De Ferran led at the restart, but slower traffic in front of the leaders enabled Vasser to overtake and hold onto the lead until the finish.

Notes
 First CART race: Greg Moore, Eddie Lawson, Mark Blundell, Jeff Krosnoff, Alex Zanardi
 Parker Johnstone did not start the race, having suffered a concussion from a practice crash.
 All American Racers returned to CART as a team and a constructor for the first time since 1986.
 This was the first CART race since 1991 that long-time entrant A. J. Foyt Enterprises did not enter, as Foyt had elected to participate in the new Indy Racing League instead.

Championship standings after the race 

Drivers' Championship standings

References

Grand Prix Of Miami, 1996
Homestead–Miami Indy 300
1996 in sports in Florida